The Manchester and Southport Railway in England opened on 9 April 1855. It merged with the Lancashire and Yorkshire Railway in 1854.  The route is still in use to day as Northern's Manchester to Southport Line.

Route
Manchester Victoria railway station.
Junction with Liverpool and Bury Railway.
Burscough Junction with the Liverpool, Ormskirk and Preston Railway.
Junction with Liverpool, Southport and Preston Junction Railway.
Southport Chapel Street.

References

Historic transport in Merseyside
Lancashire and Yorkshire Railway
Rail transport in Lancashire
Railway lines opened in 1855
Railway companies disestablished in 1888
History of transport in Greater Manchester